2K14 may refer to:

the year 2014
WWE 2K14, a video game of professional wrestling
NBA 2K14, a video game of basketball